John F. Grady (December 15, 1858 – April 26, 1924) was a professional baseball player who played one year of professional baseball for the 1884 Altoona Mountain Citys. Mainly an outfielder, Grady played in 9 games, getting 36 at bats. His batting average was .306.

Sources

1858 births
1924 deaths
Altoona Mountain Citys players
Baseball players from Massachusetts
Major League Baseball first basemen
19th-century baseball players
Pottsville Antharcites players
Trenton Trentonians players
Reading Actives players
Newark Domestics players
Lawrence (minor league baseball) players
Brockton (minor league baseball) players
Charleston Quakers players
Manchester Maroons players
Lowell Chippies players